Talog may refer to:

Places
Talog, Russia, a rural locality in Askinsky District, Bashkortostan, Russia
Talog, Carmarthenshire, a community in Carmarthenshire, Wales
Talog Gewog, a gewog (village block) in Punakha District, Bhutan

People with the name
Myfanwy Talog (1944-1995), Welsh actress